CKDJ-FM (107.9 MHz) is the campus radio station of Ottawa's Algonquin College. CKDJ's radio studios and transmitter are located on campus in Nepean.  The station can be heard in the communities around the campus and by using the station's website for live streaming.

The station was launched in 1972 as a closed circuit outlet using the call letters CBRT (College Broadcasting Radio Television). At the time, the radio and television broadcasting programs at the college were one unit, though they were later split into two completely separate entities. It was licensed by the CRTC to broadcast on FM in 1994, and was launched on October 3 that year.

Until 2003 when it moved to its current frequency, the station broadcast at 96.9 FM with a power of only 8 watts.

The station also operates a very low-power radio station at 1700 kHz on the AM dial, known as "AIR AM 1700 | All Hit Radio".

References

External links 
 CKDJ homepage
 

Algonquin College
Kdj
Kdj
Radio stations established in 1994
1994 establishments in Ontario